Hormuz peace initiative or "Hormuz peace plan" is a presented plan by Islamic Republic of Iran, in order to establish security in the region, including the Persian-Gulf, the Strait of Hormuz and the Sea of Oman. This initiative has been planned to be with the participation of all countries of the region; it is also planned to be away from the intervention of foreign forces.

Islamic Republic of Iran intends to present the mentioned plan for "regional-cooperation" in order to ensure peace in the Strait of Hormuz. The initiative was disclosed at the meeting of the 74th United Nations General Assembly by Iran. Iranian President Rouhani said Iran's Hormuz-Peace plan aims at establishing durable peace in the region. Iran insists that extra-regional powers cannot bring peace for the zone, which could be established through regional states' cooperation.

See also 
 Foreign relations of Iran
 Hormozgan Province

References 

Foreign relations of Iran
Strait of Hormuz
Middle East peace efforts